Emiliano Marsili (born 11 August 1976) is an Italian professional boxer who fights at Lightweight. He is the former International Boxing Organization Lightweight champion.

Professional career

Marsili made his professional debut in May 2003 defeating Claudiu Pop on points in Civitavecchia, Lazio. Emiliano worked his way up to a world title shot against Dejan Zlatičanin but had to pull out due to illness.

Professional boxing record

References

External links

1976 births
Living people
Lightweight boxers
European Boxing Union champions
International Boxing Organization champions
Sportspeople from the Metropolitan City of Rome Capital
Italian male boxers
People from Civitavecchia